Rose Adèle Cutts Douglas Williams (1835 – ) was an American salonière and military wife.

Rose Adèle Cutts was born in 1835 in Washington, D.C. She was the daughter of James Madison Cutts, a nephew of former President James Madison, and Ellen O'Neal, a niece of Rose O'Neal Greenhow. Her mother was from a Maryland Catholic family and raised Adele as a Catholic. She studied with her great aunt, Dolly Madison, and at Georgetown Visitation Preparatory School.

In November 1856, she married Stephen A. Douglas. With Stephen's approval, she had his two sons baptized as Catholics and reared in that faith. She had a miscarriage in 1858 and became ill. The following year, Adele gave birth to a daughter, Ellen (1859-1860), who lived only a few months. She was instrumental in his 1860 presidential campaign. When Douglas died in Chicago in June 1861, Adèle never entertained again and went into extended mourning. 

In 1866, after the Civil War, she married Robert Williams, a Union officer from Virginia; they had six children: Robert Cutts Williams (1867–1921), Ellen Williams Patton (1869–1929), Philip Williams (1870–1942), Adèle Cutts Hedges (1873-1932), James Cutts Williams (1874–1901), who died young after falling from a train in Tarlac during the Philippine Insurrection, and Mildred Mary Farwell (1878-1941).

Adèle Cutts Douglas died in 1899 in Washington, D.C. She is buried in Arlington National Cemetery.

References

External links
 
 

Created via preloaddraft
1835 births
1899 deaths
American socialites
Catholics from Washington, D.C.
19th-century American women
People from Washington, D.C.